Fuck N' Spend is the debut release and first EP by power pop band The High Speed Scene.  It was released on Arista Records on November 3, 2003.

Track listing
Fuck N' Spend (1:38)
Fuck N' Spend (1:35)

External links
A partial review of the album

2003 EPs
The High Speed Scene albums